The CSX Parmele Sub (the Old Atlantic Coastline Branch) is a branch railway line owned and operated by CSX Transportation in the U.S. state of North Carolina. It dispatches at Parmele and heads south towards Greenville. In Greenville, the tracks intersect with the old Norfolk Southern Railway, now the Carolina Coastal Railway. The track passes through Winterville, Ayden and Grifton. The terminus is a grain elevator north of Kinston.

See also
 List of CSX Transportation lines
 Wilmington and Weldon Railroad

References
picture
abandonment
proof it exists
Parmele Sub Railfan Guide
CSX Florence Division Timetable

CSX Transportation lines
Rail infrastructure in North Carolina